Dante's Inferno: An Animated Epic is a 2010 adult animated dark fantasy film. Based on Dante's Inferno video game which is itself loosely based on Dante's Inferno, Dante must travel through the circles of Hell and battle demons, creatures, monsters, and even Lucifer himself to save his beloved Beatrice. The film was released on February 9, 2010.

Plot 
Returning from the Third Crusade (1189–1192), Dante arrives home to find his servants slain, his father dead and his beloved fiancee Beatrice dying of a stab wound to the stomach. As she dies, Lucifer plucks Beatrice into the gates of Hell and Dante gives chase. Virgil appears and offers to guide him through Hell. They board Charon, a demonic, living ferry that takes souls to the First Circle of Hell. Charon commands demons to attack Dante, as no living being is allowed to enter. Dante fights them off, kills Charon, and steers him into the first circle, Limbo.

In Limbo, Dante learns Beatrice was pregnant with his child while he was away, but miscarried. Attacked by demonic children, he and Virgil escape into a large building; they enter a hall of great rulers, philosophers, and thinkers. Moving on, they battle King Minos, whose task is to send condemned souls to their sin's corresponding circle of Hell.

In the second circle, Lust, Dante is reminded that he was once unfaithful to Beatrice. Upon hearing this, Beatrice begins to lose faith.

The pair come to a grotto where men and women who had lived their lives in gluttony are devoured by Cerberus, the great hound of Hell. Virgil tells Dante that the only way to the next circle is from within the beast, so Dante allows himself to be eaten. He encounters Ciacco, a man from his village, who confesses to gluttony; Dante tells him to be free and blesses him with his cross. Dante attacks and destroys the hound's heart to escape.

In the fourth circle, Greed, Dante confronts his father. The pair trade barbs with each other and Dante kicks his father into a vat of boiling gold.

In the fifth circle, Wrath, Dante recognizes Filippo Argenti who taunts him, only to be brought down by other wrathful spirits. Dante sees Lucifer in the city of Dis; he announces to the city's damned souls his intent to marry Beatrice.

In the sixth circle, heretics do forever burn in fire and are tortured. Dante meets and kills his rival Farinata. Entering the Forest of Suicides, Dante hears a familiar cry and finds his mother growing from the sapling of a tree. Believing that she had died of a fever, Dante is overwhelmed with sorrow; he uses his cross to free her soul.

In the realm of Fraud, Virgil parts ways with Dante and Dante begins to reflect upon his own sins. Beatrice weds Lucifer and becomes a demon. Beatrice attacks Dante, forcing him to look into the ninth circle of Treachery, where he sees his greatest sin: allowing her brother to take the blame for his slaughter of the heretic prisoners. Overwhelmed with grief, he gives Beatrice her cross and pleads with her to accept the love of God. She forgives him and promises that they will be together soon, but in order to escape Hell, he will need to face Lucifer alone.

Dante realizes that he cannot stop Lucifer on his own; he begs for divine forgiveness. An explosive beam of light emanates from Dante, and Lucifer is frozen solid.

Dante dives into the chasm that leads through the earth to Purgatory to be with Beatrice, now "neither completely living, nor completely dead".

Cast

Crew
Co-Directors (1 each from the various studios)
 Victor Cook 	
 Mike Disa 	
 Sang-Jin Kim 	
 Shûkô Murase 	
 Jong-Sik Nam 	
 Lee Seung-Gyu
 Yasuomi Umetsu
 Charlie Adler – Voice Director

References

External links
 
 
 
  and  Details: Anchor Bay's Animated Dante's Inferno Feature
 Animated Dante's Inferno on the Way
 Dante’s Inferno: An Animated Epic review

2010 animated films
2010 anime films
2010 films
2010 direct-to-video films
2010s American animated films
American adult animated films
American animated horror films
Animated films based on video games
Anime films based on video games
Demons in film
The Devil in film
Film Roman films
Films based on Inferno (Dante)
Films set in hell
Japanese animated horror films
Japanese anthology films
Manglobe
Production I.G
South Korean animated horror films
Works based on Electronic Arts video games
Classical mythology in popular culture
2010 horror films
Horror anime and manga
American action horror films
Japanese action horror films
2010s fantasy action films
2010s action horror films
Japanese dark fantasy films
American dark fantasy films
Japanese animated fantasy films
Fiction about purgatory
Fantasy anthology films
American horror anthology films
Limbo
American splatter films
Japanese splatter films
2010s English-language films
2010s South Korean films